The Gate Cinema is a Grade II listed building in Notting Hill Gate, London W11.

It opened in 1911 as the Electric Palace, having been converted by William Hancock from an 1861 restaurant.

References

External links
 
 CinemaTreasures: Gate Picturehouse

Grade II listed buildings in the Royal Borough of Kensington and Chelsea
Cinemas in London
Buildings and structures in Notting Hill